Derrynaflaw (likely ), also known as Dernaflaw, is a small village and townland in County Londonderry, Northern Ireland. It is about 2 kilometres west of Dungiven on the A6 Foreglen Road. It is designated as a Hamlet and in the 2001 Census it had a population of 168 people. It lies within Causeway Coast and Glens district.

Features
The Foreglen Road bisects the settlement creating two separate housing clusters (old and new Derrynaflaw). It has basic community facilities. Recent private sector housing development complements the longer established public authority housing.

Education
St John's Primary School

References 

Villages in County Londonderry
Townlands of County Londonderry
Causeway Coast and Glens district